Pyrausta pionalis is a moth in the family Crambidae. It was described by Toll in 1948. It is found in Iran and Afghanistan.

References

Moths described in 1948
pionalis
Moths of Asia